Varre-Sai meteorite is a meteorite found in Varre-Sai, in the interior of the state of Rio de Janeiro, Brazil. Its fall was observed on June 19, 2010, by Germano da Silva Oliveira, who heard several explosions and saw two black objects falling.

See also 
 Glossary of meteoritics

References

External links 
 Meteoritical Bulletin: Entry for Varre-Sai
 The Varre-Sai chondrite, a Brazilian fall: petrology and geochemistry
 Segredos do Sistema Solar: petrografia de condritos ordinários L5 (Varre-Sai) e L6 (Putinga) 

Meteorites found in Brazil
2010 in Brazil
Meteorite falls